Metin Sitti is the Director of the Physical Intelligence Department at the Max Planck Institute for Intelligent Systems in Stuttgart, he founded the department in 2014. He is also a Professor in the Department of Information Technology and Electrical Engineering at ETH Zurich, a professor at the School of Medicine and College of Engineering at Koç University and co-founder of Setex Technologies Inc. based in Pittsburgh, USA.

Research

Overview 
Metin Sitti is a pioneer in wireless tiny medical robots, gecko-inspired adhesives, and bio-inspired miniature robots. His group, called the Physical Intelligence Department, strives to understand the principles of design, locomotion, control, perception, and learning of small-scale mobile robots. Sitti and his team aim to encode intelligence (e.g., sensing, actuation, control, memory, logic, computation, adaptation, learning and decision-making capabilities) into robots. They use smart stimuli-responsive materials, structures and mechanisms to encode intelligence into the physical body of a robot.

Research Focus 
There is intelligence through brain power – neurons gathering and transmitting electrochemical signals that make a human, an animal or insect think. But there´s another form of intelligence, and that is through the way the body is built. A gecko has feet that helps it stick to practically any surface, making his structure intelligent as it helps it survive in nature. Physical Intelligence means the hardware is smart, not just the software embedded in the brain.

Metin Sitti and his team’s research ranges from small to milli- to microscale. Some robots are so tiny they have the size of a hair. Obviously, you can´t add much hardware to such a small robot, so you have to be able to steer them around from outside, remotely. Magnetic, acoustic or light energy is the external force at play. Another way is using for instance live bacteria or algae to hook onto the robot – like a horse pulling a cart – to propel the robot forward. But how to control the bacteria which has a mind of its own? This is where biological engineering takes place where the bacteria is engineered in such a way that it is very fast in moving around, or senses specific things like a tumor.

The science in the Physical Intelligence Department is structured into three research thrusts. First, there is the Advanced Materials thrust where the researchers develop new bio-inspired, biological or synthetic materials for encoding physical intelligence into small-scale robots. As an example, his team designs, manufactures and applies gecko foot-hairs-inspired elastomer microfiber adhesives for controlled gripping, adhesion/friction, and liquid wetting of robot bodies or grippers and wearable soft sensors. Another example are self-healing and multifunctional protein materials, shape-programmable and multifunctional soft magnetic composites, stimuli-responsive liquid crystal elastomers and hydrogels, functional micro/nanomaterials, patient-derived biomaterials, and light-driven photocatalytic and liquid crystal materials for miniature soft robot actuation, propulsion, sensing, control, and physical adaptation.

Second, there is the Mobile Millirobots thrust where the robots are often down to 1 mm in size. Metin Sitti and his team look at insects, lizards, jellyfish, and many other small-scale organisms and try to understand the animal´s locomotion principles and apply that knowledge to create robots at the small scale. There are also inventions such as a soft capsule robot, which looks much like a pill. One day, a patient could be able to swallow this capsule and it could take samples of a tumor inside the stomach. One of the main breakthroughs in this thrust area is a soft millirobot named Wormmate that is able to achieve seven different locomotions at the same time in multiple terrains (solid ground, water, water surface) inspired by soft-bodied small organisms. Sitti and his team are currently working on using this and other tiny robots to one day navigate through unprecedented and hard-to-reach regions inside the body under ultrasound or x-ray medical imaging for minimally invasive medical operations. This robotic breakthrough was published in Nature in 2018 and made the headlines all across the world.

Third, there is the Mobile Microrobots thrust, which Metin Sitti hopes will one day be a standard in healthcare or biotechnology. Microrobots, through their miniature size at a sub-millimeter scale (they are less than 1mm in all dimensions), could one day be able to access enclosed spaces such as microcapillaries inside a human body. They could travel through the body´s fluids and directly interact with a tumor. Untethered mobile microrobots might enable many new applications, such as minimally invasive diagnosis and treatment inside the human body.

Soft milli- and microrobots such as those Metin Sitti and his team are developing hold huge potential and could one day have a radical impact on medicine. The scientists are working towards developing wireless tiny machines that in the near future will perhaps be able to access difficult-to-reach regions inside the body. As semi-implantable medical devices that are shape-programmable and built from biocompatible magnetic soft materials, these technologies would remain inside a patients’ body for a long time, enabling minimally or non-invasive diagnostic and therapeutic interventions.

However, many challenges must still be overcome before these tiny robots can be applied in clinics. The scientists are still faced with many challenges: they must develop ways to move and control these tiny robots inside the body with high levels of precision, taking body fluid flows and organ movement into account. They must also ensure that patient safety is guaranteed, and that these robots can be in us for long periods of time, even in the face of potential immune or other reactions.

Curriculum Vitae 
Sitti received his BSc and MSc degrees in electrical and electronics engineering from Boğaziçi University in Istanbul in 1992 and 1994, respectively, and his Ph.D. degree in electrical engineering from the University of Tokyo in 1999. He was a research scientist at UC Berkeley from 1999 to 2002 and a professor at the Department of Mechanical Engineering and Robotics Institute at Carnegie Mellon University from 2002 to 2014. He became a Director at the Max Planck Institute for Intelligent Systems in Stuttgart in 2014.

Sitti is an acclaimed scientist. On November 9, 2020, exactly 31 years after the fall of the Berlin Wall, Sitti was presented with the «Breakthrough of the Year» Award 2020 in the Engineering and Technology category by the Falling Walls World Science Summit. In March 2019, he received a prestigious Advanced Grant from the European Research Council (ERC), which is awarded only to established researchers with a proven track record of excellence. In terms of the originality and significance of research contributions, grant recipients are exceptional leaders in their given fields. What is more, Sitti and his team recently received the Best Paper Award at the prestigious Robotics Science and Systems Conference for their invention of a baby jellyfish-inspired soft millirobot with medical functions.

Sitti also received the Rahmi Koç Medal of Science (2018), Best Paper Award in the Robotics Science and Systems Conference (2019), IEEE/ASME Best Mechatronics Paper Award (2014), SPIE Nanoengineering Pioneer Award (2011), Best Paper Award in the IEEE/RSJ Intelligent Robots and Systems Conference (1998, 2009), and NSF CAREER Award (2005). He is the editor-in-chief of both Progress in Biomedical Engineering and Journal of Micro-Bio Robotics, and an associate editor for both Science Advances and Extreme Mechanics Letters.

Sitti has published two books and over 460 peer-reviewed papers, over 300 of which have appeared in archival journals. His group’s research breakthroughs have been featured in the popular press, such as New York Times, Wall Street Journal, Le Monde, The Economist, Der Spiegel, Forbes, Süddeutsche Zeitung, Science, New Scientist Science News, Nature News, MIT Technology Review, IEEE Spectrum Magazine and Stuttgarter Zeitung. He has given over 200 invited keynote, plenary or distinguished seminars in universities, conferences and industry. He has over 12 issued patents and over 15 pending patents.

Entrepreneurship 
Metin Sitti co-founded nanoGriptech Inc. in Pittsburgh, USA in 2012 to commercialize his lab’s gecko-inspired microfiber adhesive technology as a new disruptive adhesive material (branded as Setex®) for a wide range of industrial applications. The company was renamed as Setex Technologies Inc. in 2021.

References

External links

Metin Sitti at Google Scholar
Physical Intelligence Department at the Max Planck institute for Intelligent Systems

Living people
American roboticists
American mechanical engineers
Carnegie Mellon University faculty
University of Tokyo alumni
Turkish mechanical engineers
Turkish roboticists
1970 births
Max Planck Institute directors
Boğaziçi University alumni